José Genoino Neto (born 3 May 1946) is a Brazilian politician.

Biography 
Born in Quixeramobim in the state of Ceará, he fought as a guerrilla in one of the movements against the Brazilian military leaders Artur da Costa e Silva, Emílio Garrastazu Médici and Ernesto Geisel who ruled Brazil in the seventies. Ultimately, he was given amnesty, and elected as a congressman for São Paulo, serving between 1982 and 2002. At the end of 2002, he was elected president of the Brazilian Workers Party. In 2012, he was found guilty of corruption in one of the largest corruption scandals case by the Brazilian Supreme Court and, as of 2014, is under house arrest.

References

1946 births
Living people
People from Ceará
Presidents of the Workers' Party (Brazil)
Workers' Party (Brazil) politicians
Brazilian guerrillas
Members of the Chamber of Deputies (Brazil) from Ceará
Brazilian politicians convicted of corruption